Czarne may refer to the following places:
Czarne, Kuyavian-Pomeranian Voivodeship (north-central Poland)
Czarne, Podlaskie Voivodeship (north-east Poland)
Czarne in Pomeranian Voivodeship (north Poland)
Czarne, Lesser Poland Voivodeship (south Poland)
Czarne, Kościerzyna County in Pomeranian Voivodeship (north Poland)
Czarne, Gmina Kaliska in Pomeranian Voivodeship (north Poland)
Czarne, Gmina Skórcz in Pomeranian Voivodeship (north Poland)
Czarne, Gołdap County in Warmian-Masurian Voivodeship (north Poland)
Czarne, Pisz County in Warmian-Masurian Voivodeship (north Poland)
Czarne, West Pomeranian Voivodeship (north-west Poland)